The fourth season of Jane the Virgin originally aired in the United States on The CW from October 13, 2017, through April 20, 2018. The season was produced by CBS Television Studios, with Jennie Snyder Urman serving as showrunner. The series was renewed for a fourth season on January 8, 2017.

Season four stars Gina Rodriguez as Jane Villanueva, Andrea Navedo as Jane's mother Xiomara De La Vega, Ivonne Coll as Jane's grandmother Alba Villanueva, and Jaime Camil as Jane's father Rogelio De La Vega, with Justin Baldoni as Jane's lover and babydaddy Rafael Solano, and Yael Grobglas as Rafael's ex-wife and other babymama Petra Solano. Elias Janssen is added as a series regular, portraying a recast version of Jane's son Mateo Solano Villanueva.

Production
On January 8, 2017, The CW renewed the series for a fourth season. It was later announced on May 18, 2017 that the series had been moved from its Monday night time-slot to a Friday night time-slot, being paired alongside the third season of Crazy Ex-Girlfriend, premiering on October 13, 2017. The last seven episodes of the season were paired alongside Dynasty, which was moved from Wednesday night to Friday night in the middle of the broadcast season. The season also received a reduced episode account, per request of showrunner Jennie Snyder Urman, bringing the season's episode count to a total of 17, making it the shortest season of the series in total.

When the promotional poster for the season was first released, it was revealed that the character of Mateo was recast with Elias Janssen due to previous child actor Joseph Sanders being too busy with school to commit to the role. As of the first episode of the season, Janssen was credited with "starring" billing along with the six other series regulars. On September 20, 2017, it was announced that Alex Meneses was set to recur as Katherine, "owner of the Cortes Hotel Conglomerate, who is a possible investor of Rafael (Justin Baldoni) and Petra's (Yael Grobglas) hotel". On January 7, 2018, it was announced that Rosario Dawson joined the cast for a multi-episode role in the back-half of the season, though the details of her role remained kept under wraps until the character's introduction scene was released a day before her debut episode was set to air, revealing that Dawson would be playing Jane Ramos, an attorney hired to defend Petra. The back-half of the season also saw Brooke Shields in a multi-episode arc as River Fields, Rogelio's (Jaime Camil) nemesis and a spoof of the real-life actress.

On January 9, 2018, series star Gina Rodriguez announced via Instagram that she would be making her directorial debut this season, posting a photo of herself holding a Jane the Virgin clapperboard with her name next to the director slot, alongside costars Yael Grobglas and Rosario Dawson. Rodriguez's directorial debut was the tenth episode of the season, "Chapter Seventy-Four", which aired on February 9, 2018. The episode was specially selected by showrunner Jennie Snyder-Urman as it featured the characters of Jane (Gina Rodriguez) and Rafael (Justin Baldoni) having sex for the first time. "She said that it would be really great for me to be able to direct something that is so intimate and could be very uncomfortable. It could be very scary to not only shoot, but also to be in that environment...So there were a lot of layers of challenge and then it ended up being so beautiful," Rodriguez recalls of her directing experience. Costar Justin Baldoni also directs this season, taking on the fourteenth episode, "Chapter Seventy-Eight".

Cast and characters

Main
 Gina Rodriguez as Jane Villanueva
 Andrea Navedo as Xiomara De La Vega
 Yael Grobglas as Petra Solano/Anezka Archuletta
 Justin Baldoni as Rafael Solano
 Ivonne Coll as Alba Villanueva
 Elias Janssen as Mateo Solano Villanueva
 Jaime Camil as Rogelio De La Vega

Recurring

 Mia and Ella Allan as Anna and Elsa Solano
 Rosario Dawson as Jane Ramos
 Priscilla Barnes as Magda Andel
 Shelly Bhalla as Krishna Dhawan
 Justina Machado as Darci Factor
 Keller Wortham as Esteban Santiago
 Alfonso DiLuca as Jorge Garcia
 Yara Martinez as Luisa Alver
 Tyler Posey as Adam Alvaro
 Bridget Regan as Rose Solano
 Brooke Shields as River Fields
 Alex Meneses as Katherine Cortes
 Graham Sibley as Anton/Carl
 Francisco San Martin as Fabian Regalo del Cielo

Guest

Johnny Messner as Chuck Chesser
Diane Guerrero as Lina Santillan
Isabel Allende as herself
Molly Hagan as Patricia Cordero
Iyanla Vanzant as herself
Julie Chen as herself
Eve as herself
Sara Gilbert as herself
Sharon Osbourne as herself
Sheryl Underwood as herself
Eva Longoria as herself
Melanie Mayron as Marlene Donaldson
Adam Rodriguez as Jonathan Chavez
Brian Dare as Luca
Alano Miller as Roman Zazo
Mario Lopez as himself
Amy Brenneman as Donna
Brett Dier as Michael Cordero, Jr.

Episodes

Reception

Ratings

Critical response
The fourth season was received well by critics, notable praise being geared towards its storylines involving topics such as sexuality, immigration, and cancer, as well as its jaw-dropping season finale cliffhanger. Critics also praised the performances of series stars, Andrea Navedo and Yael Grobglas, as well as recurring guest stars, Tyler Posey and Rosario Dawson.

Critics first praised the fifth episode of the season in which Jane's (Gina Rodriguez) boyfriend Adam (Tyler Posey) was revealed to be bisexual. "Fortunately, Jane The Virgin handles Adam's storyline sans ignorant jokes, unchecked offensive comments, and "funny" hysteria, even if Jane's initial response displayed her own misunderstanding of the sexual orientation. It's worth noting too that no one else aside from Jane — from Xiomara to Lina to Danny — batted an eye upon hearing about Adam's sexuality. This kind of bisexual representation can help make the world a safer space for everyone, which means that this episode of Jane The Virgin is definitely one to celebrate," Alexis Reliford, a critic for Bustle said of the story, also mentioning that the show uses Jane's initial discomfort as a way to have a meaningful conversation regarding the topic of bisexuality, debunking some common misconceptions and stereotypes. As noted by Alanna Bennett of Buzzfeed News, it later becomes apparent that this one-off story was just setting some representational ground work for an even bigger storyline in the back-half of the season, featuring Petra (Yael Grobglas) developing feelings for her female lawyer, Jane Ramos (Rosario Dawson). Bennett comments on the idea of pairing Petra up with Dawson's "Jane" being a nod to the portion of the fanbase who rooted for Petra to get together with Rodriguez's "Jane". She notes that, despite only being five episodes into their storyline, "J.R. and Petra’s relationship is already electric — and confirmed to be romantic. Fanfiction empires have been built from a lot less. In a TV landscape that seems to be making way for more and more bi characters, it’s worth paying attention to what Jane the Virgin is doing here with Petra. It's not a whole new character — it's the same Petra audiences have been responding to for the past four years. But there is a shift happening in her, an enticing self-discovery. She's opening up."

TVLine awarded Andrea Navedo as "Performer of the Week" for her role in the fourteenth episode of the season, "Chapter Seventy-Eight", praising the actress for her portrayal of Xiomara post-discovery that she has breast cancer and left with the decision of whether or not to have a double mastectomy. "Navedo brought newfound vulnerability to the role. Normally tall and proud, the actress became thoughtfully muted and somehow seemed smaller, the fear and uncertainty weighing down Xo's vibrant personality. Even a mother-daughter spa day proved little distraction as Xo's eyes filled with anxiety at the thought of losing both her breasts." The storyline involving Xiomara's cancer as well as Navedo's performance of the character received additional praise in the sixteenth episode of the season, "Chapter Eighty". Critics acknowledge the show's ability to balance out Xiomara's cancer arc with some of the more lighthearted storylines. "I don't want to say, "Okay, but any show could do a good cancer story". That's absolutely not true! But while everything about Xo’s current story is effective and important, I think the most impressive thing has been watching the show figure out how to tell Xo’s story while also maintaining the balance of humor and drama and sweetness that keeps the show itself."

References

2017 American television seasons
2018 American television seasons